Jacques Varennes (6 September 1894 – 8 November 1958) was a French film actor who appeared in around seventy films during his career. He appeared in Maurice Tourneur's 1938 historical film The Patriot.

Selected filmography

 Les amours de minuit (1931) - Gaston Bouchard
 The Devil's Holiday (1931) - Charlie Thorne
 Fra Diavolo (1931) - Viani
 When Love Is Over (1931) - Robert Fournier
 Le disparu de l'ascenseur (1932) - Alfred Tortoran
 Criez-le sur les toits (1932)
 Antoinette (1932)  - M. de Saurin
 The House of Mystery (1933) - Henri Corradin
 Une nuit de folies (1934) - Julot
 Chansons de Paris (1934) - Bermasse
 Brevet 95-75 (1934) - Pierre Violey
 Little Jacques (1934) - Daniel Mortal
 Le bossu (1934) - Le prince de Gonzague
 Jim la houlette (1935) - Maitre Clisson
 Le bébé de l'escadron (1935)
 Un soir de bombe (1935) - Paulo
 Un de la légion (1936) - Durand
 La joueuse d'orgue (1936) - Robert Bernier
 Enfants de Paris (1937)
 La tour de Nesle (1937) - Jehan Buridan
 L'affaire du courrier de Lyon (1937) - Le président Gohier
 Le fraudeur (1937) - Jacques
 L'innocent (1938) - Le docteur
 Un meurtre a été commis (1938) - Le Jouyeux
 Gosse de riche (1938) - Chassigny
 The Patriot (1938) - Panine
 Le prince Bouboule (1939) - Stanik
 Fric-Frac (1939) - Tintin
 Une main a frappé (1939) - Mérignan
 Personal Column (1939) - Maxime
 Saturnin de Marseille (1941) - Le beau-père
 Péchés de jeunesse (1941) - Firmin, le maître d'hôtel
 Nadia la femme traquée (1942) - Rouaumont
 The Duchess of Langeais (1942) - Le duc de Langeais
 The Guardian Angel (1942) - Tirandier
 Le Destin fabuleux de Désirée Clary (1943) - Bernadotte
 Monsieur des Lourdines (1943) - La Marzelière
 Ne le criez pas sur les toits (1943) - Octave
 Les Roquevillard (1943) - Maître Frasne
 Finance noire (1943) - Le préfet de police
 Vautrin (1943) - Grandville
 La Malibran (1944) - La Fayette
 Pamela (1945) - Rochecotte
 Échec au roy (1945) - Le duc de Montgobert
 The Eagle with Two Heads (1948) - Comte de Foehn
 The Lame Devil (1948) - Le général de La Fayette
 Les casse-pieds (1948)
 Orpheus (1950) - Judge
 Meurtres (1950) - Hervé Annequin
 Darling Caroline (1951) - Le marquis de Bièvre / Duke
 La Poison (1951) - Le procureur
 Le chemin de la drogue (1952) - Garbo
 Mandat d'amener (1953) - Le procureur général
 Royal Affairs in Versailles (1954) - Colbert (uncredited)
 On Trial (1954) - Le juge d'instruction
 The Red and the Black (1954) - Le président du tribunal
 Les Diaboliques (1955) - M. Bridoux, professeur
 Napoleon (1955) - Boissy d'Anglas (uncredited)
 Une fille épatante (1955) - Le Président
 Maid in Paris (1956)
 If Paris Were Told to Us (1956) - Scherer
 Les carottes sont cuites (1956)
 Lovers and Thieves (1956) - Le président des Assises
 L'étrange Monsieur Steve (1957) - Arthur - le valet de chambre
 Quai des illusions (1959) - (final film role)

References

Bibliography
 Waldman, Harry. Maurice Tourneur: The Life and Films. McFarland, 2001.

External links

1894 births
1958 deaths
French male film actors
French male silent film actors
20th-century French male actors